2002 is a Hong Kong science fiction action film directed by Wilson Yip and starring Nicholas Tse and Stephen Fung.

Plot
Tide Yau is a special agent from a police force known as 2002. He, however, is not an ordinary police officer and has the ability to see ghosts. In the beginning Tide's partner is Sam, however it is Sam's time to reincarnate and so a new partner must be found. The new partner comes in the form of Wind Cheng, who can also see ghosts. Wind (apart from being afraid of ghosts) thinks it is great being the partner of Tide and everything runs smoothly until Wind finds out that the unit only operates as human-ghost partnerships, so in order for the pair to continue working for 2002, one of them must die.

Cast
 Nicholas Tse as Inspector Tide Yau
 Stephen Fung as Wind Cheng Ting-fung
 Law Kar-ying as Paper Chan
 Rain Li as Rain
 Sam Lee as Sam
 Danielle Graham as Nurse Danielle
 Alex Fong as Water Ghost
 Anya Wu as Fire Ghost
 Lee Lik-chi as Police Precinct Head Tang
 Vincent Kok as Rain's doctor
 Candy Hau as Grandma Four
 Joe Lee as Head of 2202 unit
 Joe Cheng as Police Precinct Head
 Chim Wah-leung as Police Officer Kau
 Jimmy Fu
 Natalie Tong as Female student
 Andy Tsang as Gambler ghost
 Tam Wai-ho as Siu Ho
 Terence Tsui as Muscle ghost
 Poon An-ying as Paper Chan's customer

Release
The film had a brief running in the United Kingdom on the short-lived TV channel CNX.

See also
 List of Hong Kong films

References

External links

Review from HKCuk.co.uk

2001 science fiction action films
2001 films
Hong Kong science fiction action films
Supernatural action films
Supernatural science fiction films
Hong Kong supernatural films
Police detective films
2000s Cantonese-language films
Golden Harvest films
Films directed by Wilson Yip
Films set in Hong Kong
Films shot in Hong Kong
2000s police procedural films
2000s supernatural films
2000s Hong Kong films